Saint-Gal-sur-Sioule (literally Saint-Gal on Sioule; Auvergnat: Sent Jau) is a commune in the Puy-de-Dôme department in Auvergne-Rhône-Alpes in central France.

See also
 Communes of the Puy-de-Dôme department

References

Saintgalsursioule